Yiwuzhenmohe Qaghan or Yaghmurchin Bagha Qaghan (Personal name: Qibi Geleng) was a tribal chief of Qibi tribe who ruled briefly over Turkic tribes of Xueyantuo, Tiele and Huige.

Reign 
At the time of Geleng's rule over the Tiele as Erkin or Elteber which was made of 15 tribes, at the time submitted to Western Tujue's Heshana Khan (r. 603-611). Heshana was said to be collecting excessive taxes from the Tiele, leading to resentment among the Tiele. Heshana thus suspected the Tiele chieftains and, on one occasion, gathered some 100 chieftains and slaughtered them. The Tiele there after rebelled and supported Geleng, the chieftain of the Qibi as khagan. They also supported Yishibo of Xueyantuo as Yiedie Khan, as a subordinate khan under Geleng. He also subjected cities of Gaochang, Yiwu and Yanqi.

End of reign 
Later, after Western Tujue's Shekui Khan (r. 611-619) came to power, it was said that the Tiele again submitted to Western Tujue rule and that both Geleng and Yishibo renounced their khan titles as part of the submission. The Xueyantuo would not have another khan until Yishibo's grandson Yi'nan, then a vassal of the Eastern Tujue, rebelled against Eastern Tujue and was created the Zhenzhu Khan by Emperor Taizong of Tang. Yiwuzhen's nephew Qibi Heli would go on to be a Tang general.

References 

7th-century Turkic people